The 2014 MTV EMAs (also known as the MTV Europe Music Awards) were held at The SSE Hydro, Glasgow, Scotland on 9 November 2014.  This was the first time since 2003 when the awards were held in Scotland and the fifth time the United Kingdom has hosted the MTV EMA since the show was hosted in Belfast, Northern Ireland. The event showcases the world's hottest musical acts in a different city each year. The event was hosted by Nicki Minaj.
   
Ariana Grande opened the show with "Problem" and "Break Free". An additional performance from Alicia Keys was featured at the O2 Academy Glasgow. Ozzy Osbourne received the award for Global Icon from Slash. Slash closed the show performing "Crazy Train" featuring The Conspirators and with Myles Kennedy and Simon Neil from Biffy Clyro on vocals.
 
One Direction and 5 Seconds Of Summer were the biggest winners of the night with three wins, followed by Ariana Grande and Katy Perry.

Voting process

Nominations
Winners are in bold text.

Regional nominations
Winners are in bold text.

Northern Europe

Southern Europe

Central Europe

Eastern Europe

Africa, Middle East and India

Japan and Korea

Southeast Asia, Mainland China, Hong Kong and Taiwan

Australia and New Zealand

Latin America

North America

Worldwide nominations
Winners are in bold text.

Performances

Appearances

Pre show
 Bonang Matheba — Red Carpet Host
 Laura Whitmore — Pre-Red Carpet and Backstage Host
 Sway Calloway — Pre-Red Carpet Host

Main show
 Emeli Sandé and Alicia Keys – presented Best Song
 Redfoo — presented Best Pop
 Jena Malone and Jourdan Dunn – presented Best Hip-Hop
 Laura Whitmore – presented Best Song With a Social Message
 Slash – presented Global Icon
 Afrojack – presented Worldwide Act
 David Hasselhoff, Brie Bella and Nikki Bella – presented Best Female

See also
 2014 MTV Video Music Awards

References

External links

2014
MTV Europe Music Awards
MTV Europe Music Awards
Music in Glasgow
2014 in British music